László Lachos (17 January 1933 – 20 September 2004) was a Hungarian football forward who was a member of the Hungary national team at the 1958 FIFA World Cup. However, he was never capped for his country. Lachos was born in Balassagyarmat, Hungary. In addition to the national team, he also played for FC Tatabánya.

References

External links
 FIFA profile

1933 births
2004 deaths
People from Balassagyarmat
Hungarian footballers
Association football forwards
FC Tatabánya players
1958 FIFA World Cup players
Sportspeople from Nógrád County